Write Away is a book written by Elizabeth George on writing.

References 

2004 non-fiction books
Books about writing